The 1961–62 European Cup was the seventh season of the European Cup. The competition was won by Benfica for the second time in a row, beating Real Madrid 5–3 in the final at the Olympisch Stadion in Amsterdam.

Malta entered its champion for the first time this season.

Preliminary round
The draw for the preliminary round took place in Copenhagen, Denmark, on 4 July 1961. As title holders, Benfica received a bye, and the remaining 28 teams were grouped geographically into two pots. The first team drawn in each pot also received a bye, while the remaining clubs would play the first round in September.

The calendar was decided by the involved teams, with all matches to be played by 30 September.

|}

1 The second leg was scratched and Vorwärts Berlin were advanced to the first round as Linfield were unable to arrange an alternate venue after UK immigration officials refused to issue the Vorwärts team visas to enter the country.

First leg

Second leg

Rangers won 6–4 on aggregate.

Nürnberg won 9–1 on aggregate.

Dukla Prague won 6–5 on aggregate.

Boldklubben 1913 won 15–2 on aggregate.

Feyenoord won 11–2 on aggregate.

Servette won 7–1 on aggregate.

Standard Liège won 4–1 on aggregate.

Real Madrid won 5–1 on aggregate.

Tottenham Hotspur won 10–5 on aggregate.

Partizan won 3–1 on aggregate.

Juventus won 3–2 on aggregate.

Austria Wien won 2–0 on aggregate.

Bracket

First round

|}

First leg

Second leg

Real Madrid won 12–0 on aggregate.

Standard Liège won 7–1 on aggregate.

Benfica won 6–2 on aggregate.

Tottenham Hotspur won 4–2 on aggregate.

Juventus won 7–1 on aggregate.

Dukla Prague won 5–4 on aggregate.

Rangers won 6–2 on aggregate.

Nürnberg won 3–1 on aggregate.

The Rangers-Vorwärts tie was scheduled to be played at Ibrox Stadium in Glasgow, but was moved to the Malmö Stadion in Malmö, Sweden after the East German club were again refused visas to enter the UK. The original match in Malmö was abandoned due to heavy fog with Rangers leading 1–0, and the match was replayed the following morning.

Quarter-finals

|}

1 Real Madrid beat Juventus 3–1 in a play-off to qualify for the semi-finals.

First leg

Second leg

Standard Liège won 4–3 on aggregate.

Real Madrid 1–1 Juventus on aggregate.

Benfica won 7–3 on aggregate.

Tottenham Hotspur won 4–2 on aggregate.

Semi-finals

|}

First leg

Second leg

Benfica won 4–3 on aggregate.

Real Madrid won 6–0 on aggregate.

Final

Top scorers
The top scorers from the 1961–62 European Cup (including preliminary round) are as follows:

References

External links
1961–62 All matches – season at UEFA website
 All scorers 1961–62 European Cup (excluding preliminary round) according to protocols UEFA
1961–62 European Cup – results and line-ups (archive)
European Cup results at Rec.Sport.Soccer Statistics Foundation

1961–62 in European football
European Champion Clubs' Cup seasons